Edible bird's nests are bird nests created by edible-nest swiftlets, Indian swiftlets, and other swiftlets using solidified saliva, which are harvested for human consumption. They are particularly prized in Chinese culture due to their rarity, high protein content and rich flavor. The type or grading of a bird's nest depends on the type of bird as well as the shape and color of the bird's nest. It is usually white in color, but there also exists a red version that is sometimes called "blood" nest. According to traditional Chinese medicine, it promotes good health, especially for the skin. The nests have been used in Chinese cuisine for over 400 years, most often as bird's nest soup.

Etymology

Culinary use 

The best-known use of edible birds nest is bird's nest soup, a delicacy in Chinese cuisine. When dissolved in water, the birds' nests have a favored gelatinous texture utilized in soup or sweet soup (tong sui). It is mostly referred to as 燕窩 (yànwō) unless references are made to the savory or sweet soup in Chinese cuisine. According to the Qing dynasty manual of gastronomy, the Suiyuan shidan, bird's nest was regarded as a delicate ingredient not to be flavored or cooked with anything overpowering or oily. While it is rare and expensive, it must be served in relatively large quantities; otherwise its texture cannot be fully experienced and enjoyed.

In addition to their use in soup, edible bird's nests can be used as an ingredient in other dishes. They can be cooked with rice to produce bird's nest congee or bird's nest boiled rice, or they can be added to egg tarts and other desserts. A bird's nest jelly can be made by placing the bird's nest in a ceramic container with minimal water and sugar (or salt) before double steaming.

Production and harvest

The most heavily harvested nests are from the edible-nest swiftlet or white-nest swiftlet (Aerodramus fuciphagus) and the black-nest swiftlet (Aerodramus maximus). The nests are rich in nutrients such as protein, and are traditionally believed to provide health benefits. The composition of EBN makes it esteemed as a nutritional food. Protein and carbohydrate are known to be major composition fraction of EBN which comprising 50-60% and 30-40% respectively. Previous studies conducted by Lee et al. have reported that the nutrient composition of EBN is dependent on the country of origin, food intake of the birds, climate and breeding sites. Most nests are built during the breeding season by the male swiftlet over a period of 35 days. They take the shape of a shallow cup stuck to the cave wall. The nests are composed of interwoven strands of salivary cement. Both nests have high levels of calcium, iron, potassium, and magnesium.

The nests were formerly harvested from caves, principally the enormous limestone caves at Gomantong and Niah in Borneo. With the escalation in demand these sources have been supplanted since the late-1990s by purpose-built nesting houses, usually reinforced concrete structures following the design of the Southeast Asian shop-house ("rumah toko"/"ruko"). These nesting houses are normally found in urban areas near the sea, since the birds have a propensity to flock in such places. It has become an expanding industry as is evident in such places as the province of North Sumatra or the Pak Phanang District in Thailand. From those places the nests are mostly exported to the markets in Hong Kong, which has become the center of the world trade in bird's nests; the industry is valued at around HK$2 billion per year, although most of the final consumers are from mainland China. China is the world's largest consumer of birds' nests, accounting for more than 90 percent of consumption.

In some places, nest gatherers (known in the Philippines as busyadors) have seen a steep decline in the number of birds and a rise in unexplained fatalities.

Color 
Although bird's nest is usually white, there also exists a red version, called "blood nest", which is significantly more expensive and believed to have more medicinal value.

The reason for its characteristic redness has been a puzzle for centuries. Contrary to popular beliefs, red bird's nest does not contain hemoglobin, the protein responsible for the color of human blood. Researchers reported in 2013 that 'bird soil' containing guano droppings from bird houses were able to turn white edible bird's nests red, and that edible bird's nests' color is likely caused by environmental factors in cave interiors and bird houses.

Subsequently, a research team at Nanyang Technological University, Singapore has found that its redness is caused by the vapor of reactive nitrogen species in the atmosphere of the bird house or cave reacting with the mucin glycoprotein of the initially formed white bird nest. Red bird's nest contains tyrosine that has combined with reactive nitrogen species to form 3-nitrotyrosine. At high concentrations, 3-nitrotyrosine produces a distinctively rich red color, while at lower concentrations, it produces the characteristic yellow, golden and orange colors seen in other varieties of bird's nest products.

The researchers also note that the bird nest also readily absorbs nitrite and nitrate from the process' vapor which explains why the red bird's nest contains a high concentration of nitrite and nitrate, which are known to lead to carcinogenic compounds. This may mean that non-white bird's nests are harmful to human health.

Market 

The bird's nest industry in 2014 accounts for 0.5 percent of the Indonesian GDP, a GDP percentage equivalent to about a quarter of the country's fishing industry. In Thailand, the trade value of bird's nests, both wild and "farmed", is estimated at around 10 billion baht per year. The industry globally is an estimated .

Hong Kong and the United States are the largest importers of nests.

Counterfeiting 
Besides the natural coloration process, the white nests can be treated with red pigment to defraud buyers, but methods have been developed to determine an adulterated nest. Natural red cave nests are often found in limestone caves in Pak Phayun District, Thailand. The high returns and growing demand have attracted counterfeiters, leading to the halt of Malaysian nest exports to China. The Malaysian government has since employed RFID technology to thwart counterfeiting by micro-chipping nests with details about harvesting, packaging, and transport. Industrial quality-control techniques such as failure mode and effects analysis have been applied to bird's nest processing at nesting houses in Sarawak, Malaysia and reported by a research team at Universiti Malaysia Sarawak.

Authentication 
The high demand for EBN has garnered the attention of counterfeiters to defraud buyers. Fake EBN or EBN with adulterants may be harmful to those who consume it. Hence, there is an urgent need to find a solution to the issues regarding the authenticity and quality of the EBN. Numerous sophisticated techniques have been used for the detection of adulterants in EBN such as energy disperse X-ray microanalysis, electronic microscopy and spectroscopy. Some other methods including DNA- based polymerase chain reactions, protein-based two-dimension gel electrophoresis and genetic identification based on mitochondrial DNA have found applications in the authentication of EBN. Previous studies used gel electrophoresis in combination with liquid chromatographic methods to identify some common adulterants in EBN.  In this study, gel electrophoresis and liquid chromatography were used for protein profiling and amino acids studies of cave and house nests, and others samples such as white fungus, fish swimming bladder, jelly and egg white. Each of the samples had a unique protein profile which will be reflected on the protein gel and these results were supported by the chromatographic analysis. Besides, gel electrophoresis also was used to identify and differentiate the EBN base on their geographical origins. This is due to the several advantages that make gel electrophoresis remains to be a popular option for analytical study; it is simple in operation, cost-effective and offers high sensitivity to the sample compared to other electrophoresis methods.

Import restrictions
Because a bird's nest is an animal product, it is subject to strict import restrictions in some countries, particularly with regard to H5N1 avian flu.

In Canada, commercially prepared, canned, and sterile bird's nest preparations are generally acceptable, but may be subject to import restrictions.

See also
 Traditional Chinese medicine
 List of Chinese soups
 List of delicacies
 List of soups

References

Bibliography
 
 
 
 
 
 
 
 .

Further reading

Ting Hun, Lee., Wassem, A. Wani., & Eddie, Tan Ti Tjih (2015). Edible bird's nest: An Incredible salivary bioproduct from swiflets. LAP LAMBERT Academic Publishing. .

External links
 

Chinese soups
Cantonese cuisine
Hong Kong cuisine
Bird breeding
Bird products
Apodidae